George James Veras (born October 27, 1950)  was the producer of NFL Today on CBS from 1981-1993, and vice-president of production and broadcasting for the Cleveland Browns from 2004-2007.  His productions have won 10 Emmy Awards.  He is currently president and CEO of Pro Football Hall of Fame Enterprises, president of Veras Communications, Inc. (VCI), and adjunct professor at the Weatherhead School of Management at Case Western Reserve University.

Life
Veras graduated from Shaker Heights High School in Cleveland. He went to college in 1969 at New York University where he obtained his bachelor's degree, a Master of Public Administration (1974) and completed his course work for Masters in Business Administration but did not finish thesis and did not receive degree.  George and his family currently live in Brecksville, Ohio

See also 
 Major League Baseball on CBS
 Ellis Island Medal of Honor
 Yanni Live at the Acropolis
 Yanni Live at Royal Albert Hall
 Yanni Live! The Concert Event
 Ethnicity (album)

References

https://www.proceso.com.mx/reportajes/2019/10/20/gran-estafa-en-mexico-la-sombra-del-salon-de-la-fama-de-la-nfl-232990.html 

 [https://www.proceso.com.mx/reportajes/2019/10/20/gran-estafa-en-mexico-la-sombra-del-salon-de-la-fama-de-la-nfl-232990.html.
Proceso. 2019-20-10

[Grand Scam in Mexico, in the shadow of The NFL Hall of Fame]

Chief executives in the media industry
American television producers
Sports Emmy Award winners
Case Western Reserve University faculty
1950 births
Living people
New York University Stern School of Business alumni
Robert F. Wagner Graduate School of Public Service alumni
American people of Greek descent
People from Brecksville, Ohio